Opal Tower can mean:

 Opal Tower (Leeds), a skyscraper in Leeds, England
 Opal Tower (Sydney), a skyscraper in Sydney, Australia